Nicholas Ayles Stillingfleet  Bury is an Anglican priest: he was Dean of Gloucester from 1997 until 2010.

Born on 8 January 1943, he was educated at The King's School, Canterbury and Queens' College, Cambridge, trained for the ministry at Ripon College Cuddesdon (during which time his predecessor, Kenneth Jennings, was Vice Principal) and ordained in 1969. After a curacy in Liverpool he was Chaplain of Christ Church, Oxford He was Vicar of Shephall and then St Peter in Thanet until his appointment to the Deanery.

Notes

1943 births
People educated at The King's School, Canterbury
Alumni of Queens' College, Cambridge
Alumni of Ripon College Cuddesdon
Deans of Gloucester
Living people